Gastrolobium minus, also known as broad-leaved brachysema,  is a prostrate shrub which is endemic to the south-west of  Western Australia. It is a member of the family Fabaceae and of the genus Gastrolobium, which contains many toxic species, however the toxicity of this species is unknown.

Description
The plant grows to about 1 metre in diameter and has leaves that are oval in shape with a dark green upper surface and a silky undersurface. The flowers appear predominantly between July and October in the species' native range. These are orange-red with a standard that has recurved margins and yellow markings

Distribution and habitat
The species occurs in open Jarrah (Eucalyptus marginata) forest near Mount Barker and  Cranbrook, with an outlying population in Fitzgerald River National Park.

Cultivation
The species has been popular in cultivation for many years, often distributed under the incorrect name of Brachysema latifolium. 
The plant may be used as a groundcover on embankments or in large containers or hanging baskets. It prefers light shade and good drainage, and is somewhat frost-tolerant.

References

External links
 

minus
Rosids of Western Australia
Garden plants
Endemic flora of Western Australia
Taxa named by Michael Crisp